Adolphus James Sparrow (10 May 1869 – 6 September 1936) was an English first-class cricketer who represented Hampshire in one first-class match in 1904 against Leicestershire. In his only first-class innings Sparrow made 1 run before being dismissed by John King.

External links
Adolphus Sparrow at Cricinfo
Adolphus Sparrow at CricketArchive

1869 births
1936 deaths
People from Gosport
English cricketers
Hampshire cricketers
People from Minster, Swale